FC Dinamo Kant is a Kyrgyzstani football club based in Kant that plays in the top division in Kyrgyzstan, the Kyrgyzstan League.

History 
1997: Founded as FC Dinamo Kant.
1998: Dissolved.

Achievements
Kyrgyzstan League:
8th place, Zone A: 1998

Kyrgyzstan Cup:

Current squad

External links 
Profile at sport.kg

Football clubs in Kyrgyzstan
1998 disestablishments in Kyrgyzstan